The following is a list of songs featured in the television series Victorious.

References

Victorious
Victorious
Victorious songs